William Haskell (born June 28, 1996) is an American politician and a former member of the Connecticut State Senate, representing District 26 from 2019 to 2023. The district includes the towns of Redding, Ridgefield, Wilton, and parts of Bethel, Weston, Westport, and New Canaan. The 26th District has not been represented by another Democrat since 1973. Haskell is a member of the Democratic Party, and was a member of the State Senate Democratic Caucus.

Education 
Haskell attended school in the Westport Public School System and graduated from Staples High School in 2014, where he was an active member of Staples Players, the student theater group. He attended Georgetown University majoring in Government and minoring in Journalism. He graduated Phi Beta Kappa in May 2018, shortly after launching his campaign in March of that same year. He hired his college roommate as his campaign manager. He plans on attending law school in New York City following the conclusion of his state senate term in 2023. He is the youngest of four brothers.

Career 

Will Haskell ran for and won the 26th district in 2018 as a first-time candidate, beating incumbent Republican Toni Boucher who had held the state senate seat since 2009. His campaign received endorsements from Congressman Jim Himes, Senator Chris Murphy of Connecticut, and former president Barack Obama. Haskell wrote a book about his 2018 election, entitled 100,000 First Bosses: My Unlikely Path as a 22-Year-Old Lawmaker, which was published in January 2022.

In December 2019, Haskell was named as one of Forbes' 30 under 30 in Law and Policy. Haskell is the youngest state senator in the country.

Haskell serves as the Senate Chairman of the Transportation Committee and previously served as the Senate Chairman of the Higher Education and Employment Advancement Committee. He has also served on the Environment, Energy and Technology, Government Administration and Elections, Human Services, and Public Health Committees. In 2021, Haskell was appointed to Governor Lamont's Workforce Council. Haskell is a NewDEAL Leader. He was appointed by Senate President Martin Looney as Senate Deputy President Pro Tempore.

Haskell was involved in the unsuccessful fight to install tolls on Connecticut highways and helped lead the successful passage of legislation bringing free community college to Connecticut. He has voted in favor of Paid Family and Medical Leave, a $15 minimum wage, a ban on ghost guns, cannabis legalization and police accountability reforms. During his first term, he co-sponsored 23 new laws and held over 70 town hall meetings. Haskell has earned a 100% approval score from the Connecticut League of Conservation Voters, a 0% approval score from the National Rifle Association, and a 100% attendance record for votes on the Senate floor. His campaigns and legislative career have been reported on in The New York Times, Teen Vogue, ABC News, Time Magazine, and Quartz.

On January 3, 2022, Haskell announced that he would not seek reelection that year and would retire at the end of his term, citing his desire to attend law school and live closer to his fiancée, Katie Cion, in New York City.

Electoral history

References 

1996 births
21st-century American memoirists
21st-century American politicians
Democratic Party Connecticut state senators
Georgetown College (Georgetown University) alumni
Living people
People from New Canaan, Connecticut
People from Westport, Connecticut
Staples High School alumni
Writers from Connecticut